Thomas James Eaves (born 14 January 1992) is an English professional footballer who plays as a striker for Rotherham United.

Career

Oldham Athletic
Eaves was born in Liverpool, Merseyside. He joined Oldham Athletic's Centre of Excellence as a youth player at Under-15 age group having previously been at Crewe Alexandra.

He made his Football League debut on 23 January 2010 as a substitute during a 1–0 defeat to Millwall. He made 15 appearances in the 2009/10 season for Oldham, all of them as a substitute. Eaves' breakthrough in the first team soon earned him his first professional contract on a two-year contract. However, Manager Dave Penney claimed that Eaves rejected a new contract and dropped him from the first team unless he resolved his own future.

He scored a hat-trick in a pre-season friendly against Bolton Wanderers on 28 July 2010. Shortly after, Eaves' performance soon attracted from many clubs were keen to sign him. Manager Paul Dickov later confirmed that there were offers from clubs to sign Eaves.

Bolton Wanderers
He joined Bolton Wanderers on a three-year contract for an undisclosed fee on 12 August 2010.

Eaves joined the Bolton team on their pre-season tour of America preceding the 2011–12 season, but was injured. He didn't return from the injury until the following summer, although he made an appearance for the reserves in December 2011.

Eaves signed a new three-year contract with Bolton in January 2013. Having been sent on loan to Shrewsbury Town earlier in the season, he was recalled on 15 April 2013 and made his debut for the club a day later, coming on as a substitute for David N'Gog in a 3–2 defeat against Leicester City.

At the end of the 2015–16 season, the club confirmed that he would be leaving when his contract expired at the end of June.

Loan spells

Bristol Rovers
On 27 September 2012, Eaves joined League Two Bristol Rovers on a three-month loan deal. After failing to score against Exeter City and Cheltenham Town, he scored his first league goal on 6 October as his loan side beat Northampton Town On 20 October 2012, Bristol Rovers beat local rivals Torquay United 3–2 at the Memorial Stadium, he scored 2 goals in this match. He added another goal to his tally in an away match against AFC Wimbledon on 23 October 2012, which Rovers lost 3–1. On 10 November 2012, he scored the match winner after having set up the two other goals against Chesterfield at the Memorial Stadium in a 3–2 victory. Eaves went on to make seventeen appearances and scoring seven times in all competitions before returning on 28 December 2012.

Shrewsbury Town
On 21 February 2013, Eaves joined Shrewsbury Town on an initial one-month loan deal. He made his debut against Stevenage on 23 February, and scored his first goal for the club in the following game on 26 February in a 2–1 loss at home to Doncaster Rovers. On 12 March 2013, he then later scored two against Milton Keynes Dons in a 3–2 win. Weeks later on 22 March 2013, Eaves' loan spell with the club was extended until the end of April. On 1 April, he scored his first senior hat-trick in a 3–0 win against Crawley Town. Weeks after scoring a hat-trick, Eaves was recalled by the club on 15 April 2013.

Rotherham United
On 21 September 2013, Eaves joined League One side Rotherham United on a three-month loan deal. He made his debut on the same day for The Millers in a 1–1 draw away at Walsall, coming on as a 72nd-minute substitute for Kieran Agard. He was recalled by his parent club on 25 November 2013 after making eight appearances for Rotherham United.

Shrewsbury Town
On 28 November 2013, Eaves returned on an emergency loan for Shrewsbury Town initially until 5 January 2014. He scored a goal on his second debut, in a 3–1 victory away at Stevenage two days later. His loan was later extended to the end of the 2013/14 season. Eaves then scored his second Shrewsbury Town goal on a late minutes, in a 1–1 draw against Brentford on 1 February 2014.

Yeovil Town
On 27 November 2014, Eaves joined League One side Yeovil Town on loan until 5 January 2015. Eaves made his Yeovil Town debut two days later, making his first start and playing 90 minutes, in a 2–0 loss against Preston North End. Eaves played seven matches for Yeovil without scoring a goal before returning to Bolton at the end of his loan spell.

Bury
Eaves joined League Two side Bury on loan until the end of the season. The same day, Eaves made his Bury debut, in a 1–0 loss against Mansfield Town. Eaves then scored his first Bury goal, in a 2–1 loss against Morecambe on 6 April 2015. After making nine appearances for the club, Eaves made his return to his parent club.

Yeovil Town
After his release from Bolton, on 1 July 2016, Eaves signed for League Two side Yeovil Town on a one-year deal. He scored his first goal for Yeovil in a 1–1 draw with Luton Town on 13 August 2016. At the end of the 2016–17 season, Eaves was released by Yeovil along with five other players.

Gillingham
Following his release from Yeovil, on 22 June 2017, Eaves signed for League One club Gillingham on a two-year deal. He made his debut for the club on the first day of the 2017–18 season in a 0–0 draw away to Doncaster Rovers. His first goals for the club came on 26 August 2017 when he scored a second half hat-trick in a 3–3 draw against Southend United. Eaves would end the 2017–18 season as the club's top goalscorer with 18 goals in all competitions.

Eaves repeated the feat in the following season, with a tally of 22 goals in all competitions. He received the club's Players' Player of the Year award and the Goal of the Season award for his effort away at Portsmouth in October 2018. The same goal was later voted by Gillingham fans as their 'goal of the decade'.

Hull City
Eaves was offered a new contract by Gillingham at the end of the 2018–19 season, but refused it and decided to leave upon the expiration of his contract, thus becoming a free agent. On 10 July 2019, he signed for Championship club Hull City on a free transfer, signing a three-year contract. Eaves made his first appearance for the club in the first match of the 2019–20 season in the 2–1 away defeat to Swansea City, when he came off the bench to replace Nouha Dicko. He scored his first goal for the club on 1 October 2019, the only goal, in the home match against Sheffield Wednesday, after coming on as a substitute for Josh Magennis. Eaves was released at the end of the 2021–22 season.

Rotherham United (second spell)
Following his departure from Hull, Eaves rejoined former club Rotherham.

Career statistics

Honours 
Hull City
 EFL League One: 2020–21

References

External links

1992 births
Living people
Footballers from Liverpool
English footballers
Association football forwards
Bolton Wanderers F.C. players
Bristol Rovers F.C. players
Oldham Athletic A.F.C. players
Shrewsbury Town F.C. players
Rotherham United F.C. players
Yeovil Town F.C. players
Bury F.C. players
Gillingham F.C. players
Hull City A.F.C. players
English Football League players